Władysław Antoni Żmuda (born 6 June 1954) is a Polish former professional footballer, who played as a defender for Śląsk Wrocław, Widzew Łódź, Hellas Verona, New York Cosmos and US Cremonese. He earned 91 caps for the Poland national team and is a four-time FIFA World Cup participant.

Club career
Żmuda was born in Lublin. He spent six years learning his trade with his first club Motor Lublin before finally spreading his wings in 1973 and switching to Gwardia Warsaw, one of the Polish capital's clubs. The 19-year-old Żmuda was instrumental in Gwardia's UEFA Cup campaign of 1973–74 where they narrowly lost out to eventual winners Feyenoord. Żmuda pursued his career in Poland with Śląsk Wrocław and later Widzew Łódź before Italian club Hellas Verona secured permission to sign him from Poland in 1982. After two injury-plagued seasons at Verona, Żmuda spent a brief spell with New York Cosmos before returning to Italy with US Cremonese, playing two of his three seasons with the club in Serie B. Żmuda ended his playing career in 1988.

International career

Żmuda played for the Polish national team, for which he earned 91 caps and scored 2 goals.

He was a participant at four FIFA World Cups, the first in 1974, where Poland reached third place. He was named as the best young player of the tournament.

He played a total of 21 matches at the World Cup finals, the third-most ever, tied with Uwe Seeler and Diego Maradona and behind only Lothar Matthäus, Paolo Maldini, Miroslav Klose and Lionel Messi. His four tournaments, in 1974, 1978, 1982 and 1986, place him fourth in the all-time rankings behind Messi, Cristiano Ronaldo, Antonio Carbajal and Matthäus and level with legends of the game, such as Pelé, Maradona and Gianni Rivera.

He was also a participant at the 1976 Summer Olympics, where Poland won the silver medal.

Honours

Club
Śląsk Wrocław
Ekstraklasa: 1976-77
Polish Cup: 1975–76

Widzew Łódź
Ekstraklasa: 1980–81, 1981–82

International
Poland
Olympic silver medal: 1976
FIFA World Cup bronze medal: 1974, 1982

Individual
FIFA World Cup Best Young Player Award: 1974

Notes

References

External links
 
 
 NASL stats
 Profile at Lega Calcio
 

1954 births
Living people
Sportspeople from Lublin
Polish footballers
Olympic footballers of Poland
Olympic silver medalists for Poland
Poland international footballers
Association football defenders
Footballers at the 1976 Summer Olympics
Śląsk Wrocław players
Widzew Łódź players
Motor Lublin players
North American Soccer League (1968–1984) players
New York Cosmos players
Hellas Verona F.C. players
U.S. Cremonese players
Serie A players
Serie B players
Expatriate footballers in Italy
1974 FIFA World Cup players
1978 FIFA World Cup players
1982 FIFA World Cup players
1986 FIFA World Cup players
Polish expatriate footballers
Polish expatriate football managers
Ekstraklasa players
Olympic medalists in football
Expatriate football managers in Tunisia
Gwardia Warsaw players
Expatriate soccer players in the United States
Polish expatriate sportspeople in the United States
Medalists at the 1976 Summer Olympics
Polish football managers
Espérance Sportive de Tunis managers